The Bulgarian Gendarmerie' (Жандармерия – Zhandarmeriya) is part of the Bulgarian Ministry of Internal Affairs or "MIA". (Bulgarian: "Министерство на вътрешните работи" or "МВР", pronounced [mevere]). It forms part of the country's National Police Service.

The Genderarmerie originated from the Interior Troops of the MIA after the transition period from a socialist regime to democracy between 1989 and 1991. It was organised as a National Service "Gendarmerie", equal in status and independent from the National Service "Police".

It was a militarized special police force, deployed to secure important facilities and buildings, to respond to riots, and to counter militant threats.  Its agents are trained to operate in both urban and wilderness environments so as to be able to carry out a wide range of duties. For riot duty the commandos are equipped with Makarov 9x18 pistols, protective gear, gas grenades, police sticks and non-lethal weapons. When performing high-risk tactical operations they are armed with 5.45x39mm AKS-74U rifles, which are specialized versions of the original Kalashnikov assault rifle. The Gendarmerie was meant to be a force structure intermediate between the army and the police which has military status.

The service members had military-style ranks from sergeant to colonel, following a system used throughout the Bulgarian police forces.  The overall commander of the force was usually a Major General.

The reform of the Ministry of Internal Affairs from 2012 has the service disbanded and its manpower and equipment absorbed into the Police with a change in the naming from Gendarmerie to Specialized Police Forces (erroneously translated into English as Special Police Forces, which could be seen on some of the daily attire of its service members). The name change was reverted to Gendarmerie in 2014, but the service did not regain its separate status and it remained a part of the Main Directorate of National Police (Главна дирекция "Национална полиция").

Current structure 
After the latest reform of the service its members no longer hold military-style ranks, having transferred to the uniform ranking system of the police. At the head of the Gendarmerie is a director with the two-star rank of a senior commissary, aided by a deputy director with the rank of a commissary (corresponding to an army colonel).

 Central apparatus:
 Administrative and Training Sector
 Sector for Protection of Banking and High Security Institutions
 Sector for Organization of Protective Measures
 Commandature Sector
 Territorial organization. Each zone department is headed by a chief inspector (lieutenant-colonel equivalent). The only exception is the ZGD Sofia, as it manpower almost equals the other seven ZGDs combined and is therefore headed by a commissar (a colonel equivalent):
 Zone Gendarmerie Department Sofia
 Zone Gendarmerie Department Pleven
 Zone Gendarmerie Department Plovdiv
 Zone Gendarmerie Department Montana
 Zone Gendarmerie Department Kardzhali
 Zone Gendarmerie Department Burgas
 Zone Gendarmerie Department Varna
 Zone Gendarmerie Department Gorna Oryahovitsa

The Gendarmerie units are a high-readiness operational reserve of the Bulgarian police, held centrally under the command of Main Directorate of National Police. Each of the provincial directorates of the National Police has a similarly equipped and tasked Specialized Police Forces unit and these number from over 530 (in Sofia's metropolitan police department SDVR) to as few as a squad of less than 10 people in most provincial ODMVR departments. These units are visually similar to the Gendarmerie and function in a similar manner, but locally for their respective territorial departments.

A current reform plan of the government (as of 2020) calls for the integration of the Ministry's primary counter-terror unit – the SOBT and the Gendarmerie Directorate into a new Main Directorate of Gendarmerie, Special Operations and Counter-Terror (Жандармерия, специални операции и борба с тероризма" - ГДЖСОБТ) (in a manner similar to the amalgamation of the French Gendarmerie's GIGN and territorial quick reaction units). The plan has encountered serious criticism from within and without the Ministry of the Interior, political parties and security, public order and counter-terror experts.

References

External links
 Chief Directorate "Gendarmerie" on the website of the Bulgarian Ministry of Interior

Gendarmerie
Gendarmerie
Gendarmerie